was a Japanese daimyō of the Edo period.

The Makino were identified as one of the fudai or insider daimyō clans which were hereditary vassals or allies of the Tokugawa clan, in contrast with the tozama or outsider clans.

Makino clan genealogy
The fudai Makino clan originated in 16th century Mikawa Province. Their elevation in status by Toyotomi Hideyoshi dates from 1588.  They claim descent from Takechiuchi no Sukune, who was a legendary Statesman   and lover of the legendary Empress Jingū.

Tadamasa was part of the senior branch of the Makino which was established at Tako Domain in Kōzuke Province in 1590;  and in 1616, their holdings were moved to Nagamine Domain in Echigo Province.  From 1618 through 1868, this branch of the Makino remained at Nagaoka Domain (74,000 koku) in Echigo Province.

Tadamasa was the 10th-generation head of this senior line of the Makino.

The head of this clan line was ennobled as a "Viscount" in the Meiji period.

Tokugawa official
Tadamasa served as the Tokugawa shogunate's forty-eighth Kyoto shoshidai in the period spanning February 15, 1840, through December 23, 1843.

Tadamasa held a variety of positions in the Tokugawa shogunate, including rōjū.  A staunch supporter of Abe Masahiro, when Tadamasa became a rōjū, he was placed in charge of organizing coastal defenses. He resigned shortly after Hotta Masayoshi replaced the recently deceased Abe; Tadamasa himself died the following year.

Notes

References
 Appert, Georges and H. Kinoshita. (1888).  Ancien Japon. Tokyo: Imprimerie Kokubunsha.
 Bolitho, Harold. (1974). Treasures Among Men: The Fudai Daimyo in Tokugawa Japan. New Haven: Yale University Press.  ;  OCLC 185685588
 Meyer, Eva-Maria. (1999).  Japans Kaiserhof in de Edo-Zeit: Unter besonderer Berücksichtigung der Jahre 1846 bis 1867. Münster: Tagenbuch. 
 Papinot, Jacques Edmund Joseph. (1906) Dictionnaire d'histoire et de géographie du japon. Tokyo: Librarie Sansaisha...Click link for digitized 1906 Nobiliaire du japon (2003)
 Sasaki Suguru. (2002). Boshin sensō: haisha no Meiji ishin. Tokyo: Chūōkōron-shinsha.

External links
 National Archives of Japan  ... Nagaoka Castle (1644)

|-

Daimyo
Makino clan
Rōjū
1799 births
1858 deaths
People from Nagaoka Domain